Sheikh Zahiruddin was a Member of the 2nd National Assembly of Pakistan as a representative of East Pakistan.

Career
Zahiruddin was a Member of the 2nd National Assembly of Pakistan. He was the Minister for Education and for Health of Pakistan.

References

Pakistani MNAs 1955–1958
Living people
Year of birth missing (living people)